The Carnegie Library in Hickman, Kentucky is a Carnegie library building from 1908. It was listed on the National Register of Historic Places in 1990.

It is a one-story brick Colonial Revival-style building.

References

Library buildings completed in 1908
Libraries on the National Register of Historic Places in Kentucky
Colonial Revival architecture in Kentucky
National Register of Historic Places in Fulton County, Kentucky
1908 establishments in Kentucky
Carnegie libraries in Kentucky
Education in Fulton County, Kentucky